The Secret of the Mummy is a 1921 German silent crime film directed by Victor Janson and starring Ferdinand von Alten, Aud Egede-Nissen, and Magnus Stifter. It is part of the Joe Deebs detective series. Originally shot in 1916, it did not go on general release until 1921.

The film's sets were designed by the art director Kurt Richter.

Cast

References

Bibliography

External links

1921 films
Films of the Weimar Republic
German silent feature films
Films directed by Victor Janson
1921 crime films
German crime films
UFA GmbH films
German black-and-white films
Mummy films
Silent horror films
1920s German films